Thea Garrett (born 1992) is a Maltese singer and musical theatre performer who represented Malta in the Eurovision Song Contest 2010 in Oslo.

Eurovision 2010
In 2010, Garrett won the Maltese national final to represent Malta in the Eurovision Song Contest 2010 with the song "My Dream". Garrett performed in the first semi-final on 25 May 2010 in Oslo, Norway. but failed to qualify for the final, placing 12th and released her first single, Frontline.

Singles
My Dream (2010)
Frontline (2011)
Walk On By (2011)

References

1992 births
Eurovision Song Contest entrants of 2010
Living people
Eurovision Song Contest entrants for Malta
21st-century Maltese women singers
21st-century Maltese singers